A Blessing in disguise is an English language idiom.

Blessing in Disguise  may also refer to:

Music
 A Blessing in Disguise, a 2003 album by Green Carnation
 Blessing in Disguise (Metal Church album), a 1989 album
 Blessing in Disguise, a 1994 album by Annie Haslam with Renaissance

Literature
 Sengsara Membawa Nikmat or Blessing in Disguise, a 1929 novel by Tulis Sutan Sati
 Blessing in Disguise, a play by Jason Howland and Larry Pellegrini